The Liberal Party was a far-right corporatist and anti-communist political party in South Korea established in 1951 by Syngman Rhee.

History
As the 1952 presidential elections neared, Rhee made public his intention to organize a party during his August 15 Speech in 1951.  Rhee called Yi Bum-seok, then the ambassador in China, and charged him with creating the Liberal Party. Yi used the strong organizational base of "Korean National Youth Association" as a starting point and incorporated the major five organizations: "National Association for the Rapid Realisation of Korean Independence", "Korean Federation of Labor", "Peasant Federation", and "Korean Council of Wives" as temporary sub-organizations under the Liberal Party.

Ideology
Although the name "Liberal Party" is used, it is not the traditional definition as used in the West. For example, the Liberal Party advocated for Ilminism and viewed Western-style liberalism and individualism negatively, instead suggesting the need for "Korean-style liberal democracy". One of the main values of Ilminism was the Hongik Ingan, based on traditional conservatism, and the Students Protection Corps, which is said to be similar to Hitlerjugend. To this day, the term "liberal democracy" in South Korea is still used in a similar sense to "anti-communist system" or "free world against communism" by the conservative camp of South Korea, rather than the same meaning as Western liberal democracy.

Ahn Ho-sang and Lee Beom-seok, the founders of Ilminism, were influenced by Nazism, Shōwa Statism, and Italian Fascism. In particular, Ahn Ho-sang is known as the most conservative and extreme nationalist in the modern history of South Korea. This may be confusing as Japan was largely viewed negatively by South Koreans at the time, and arguably still in present day, but both Ahn Ho-sang and Lee Beom-seok admired only the political and nationalist aspects of Imperial Japan and Nazi Germany whilst opposing those regimes.

The Liberal Party put forward "anti-communist and anti-Japanese" as its national values during its reign. At the same time, however, the Liberal Party showed a very pro-American tendency, so it was closer to right-wing populism than resistance nationalism. The Liberal Party supported a discriminatory policy against "hwagyo" based on Korean ethnic supremacy and anti-PRC.

Due to the historical political position of the far-right conservative "Liberal Party", so far, South Korea's center-left liberal political forces have resulted in calling themselves liberals but avoiding direct use of the party name "Liberal Party".

Election results

President

Vice President

Legislature

House of Representatives

House of Councillors

Notes

References

 
1951 establishments in South Korea
Anti-Chinese sentiment in South Korea
Anti-communism in South Korea
Anti-Japanese sentiment in South Korea
Conservative parties in South Korea
Corporatism
Defunct far-right parties
Defunct nationalist parties
Defunct political parties in South Korea
Far-right politics in South Korea
National conservative parties
Political parties established in 1951
Syngman Rhee